The Canton of Vineuil is a canton in the French department of Loir-et-Cher, central France. Its borders were modified at the French canton reorganisation which came into effect in March 2015. Its seat is in Vineuil.

It consists of the following communes:
 
Blois (partly)
Cellettes
Cheverny
Chitenay
Cormeray
Cour-Cheverny
Saint-Gervais-la-Forêt
Vineuil

References

Cantons of Loir-et-Cher